Billy Duane Tubbs (March 5, 1935 – November 1, 2020) was an American men's college basketball coach. The Tulsa, Oklahoma native was the head coach of his alma mater Lamar University (1976–1980, 2003–2006), the University of Oklahoma (1980–1994) and Texas Christian University (1994–2002).  His first head coaching job — from 1971-72 through 1972-73 — was at Southwestern University, Georgetown, Texas, where his teams were 12–16 and 19–8.  From there he went to the University of North Texas to serve as assistant coach under Gene Robbins and for one year under Bill Blakeley.

Tubbs was known for his high scoring offense and full-court press defense.

Tubbs achieved many coaching milestones during his coaching career. He became the ninth coach in NCAA history to record 100 wins at three different schools (Oklahoma 333, TCU 156 and Lamar 121). He became the 28th coach in NCAA Division I history to record 600 wins in Lamar's 79-67 win over Texas Southern during the 2003-04 season.

Early life and college playing career
Born in St. Louis, Missouri, Tubbs grew up in Tulsa, Oklahoma and attended Central High School in Tulsa. Tubbs then attended Lamar State College of Technology (now Lamar University) in Beaumont, Texas and lettered in basketball from 1955 to 1957. As a junior in 1955–56, Tubbs averaged 6.7 points and 3.1 rebounds for Lamar Tech.

Coaching career
Tubbs was an assistant at Lamar Tech from 1960 to 1971. Later, he was head coach at Southwestern University from 1971 to 1973. Tubbs was the assistant men's basketball coach at the University of North Texas for three seasons, 1973-74 & 1974-75 under head coach Gene Robbins and 1975-76 under head coach Bill Blakeley.  In Blakeley's first season at North Texas, Tubbs, with newly hired assistant coach Jimmy Gales, helped turn around a team that had been 6-20 in 1975, to 22-4 in 1976, averaging 96 points a game – the second highest in the nation.  After that season, Tubbs accepted his first head coaching job at Lamar University for the 1976-77 season.

In 31 years of coaching, Tubbs compiled a 641-340 (.653) career record, including a 121-89 record in seven years at Lamar. He guided 12 teams to NCAA tournament appearances, six National Invitation Tournament appearances, eight conference championships, three conference tournament championships and 18 20-win seasons. His 641 wins ranks 34th all-time in NCAA history.  While at Oklahoma, Tubbs guided the Sooners to runner-up finishes in the NCAA Tournament (1988) and the National Invitation Tournament (1991).  Basketball Weekly named Tubbs National Coach of the Year in 1983 and 1985. His 333 wins at OU are the most in school history.

On May 27, 2002, Tubbs returned to Lamar University as Director of Athletics.  Ten months later, on March 21, 2003, he also became Lamar's head basketball coach for the second time.  In March 2006, Tubbs resigned as head coach, but remained as Director of Athletics. He was succeeded by Steve Roccaforte. On June 14, 2010, Tubbs resigned as athletic director to become special advisor to Lamar University President James Simmons on athletics.  He was succeeded by Larry Tidwell. Tubbs retired at the end of August 2011.

In a halftime ceremony on February 19, 2011, Lamar dedicated the Montagne Center basketball floor as the "Billy & Pat Tubbs Court", named in honor of the coach and his wife. During the same ceremony the school also honored Billy's 1978-79 Cardinals squad, the first team in Lamar University history to advance to the NCAA tournament.

Death and legacy
Tubbs died in Norman, Oklahoma on November 1, 2020, after battling leukemia for five years. He was 85 years old. The long-time TCU basketball coach is immortalized in the Dallas-Fort Worth area by 'Fake Billy Tubbs' a recurring bit character on the prominent local sports radio station The Ticket. Tubbs is also remembered for doing a mean Jack Nicholson impression.

Head coaching record

See also
 List of college men's basketball coaches with 600 wins
 List of NCAA Division I Men's Final Four appearances by coach

References

External links
Lamar administrative profile
Lamar coaching profile
TCU profile

1935 births
2020 deaths
Basketball coaches from Missouri
Basketball players from St. Louis
Basketball coaches from Oklahoma
Basketball players from Oklahoma
Central High School (Tulsa, Oklahoma) alumni
College men's basketball head coaches in the United States
Deaths from cancer in Oklahoma
Deaths from leukemia
Lamar Cardinals basketball coaches
Lamar Cardinals basketball players
Lamar Cardinals and Lady Cardinals athletic directors
Lon Morris Bearcats basketball players
North Texas Mean Green men's basketball coaches
Oklahoma Sooners men's basketball coaches
Southwestern Pirates men's basketball coaches
Sportspeople from Tulsa, Oklahoma
Stephen F. Austin State University alumni
TCU Horned Frogs men's basketball coaches